Mark P. Mattson is a Professor of Neuroscience at Johns Hopkins University. He is the former Chief of the Laboratory of Neurosciences at the National Institute on Aging Intramural Research Program of the National Institute on Aging.

Mattson has done research on intermittent fasting. The National Institute of Health considers him "one of the world’s top experts on the potential cognitive and physical health benefits of intermittent fasting". He is author of the book "The Intermittent Fasting Revolution: The Science of Optimizing Health and Enhancing Performance".. He also hosts a podcast called 'Brain Ponderings' where he interviews prominent neuroscientists about their life and  work

Awards and recognition 
Mattson was elected a Fellow of the American Association for the Advancement of Science for research revealing the cellular mechanisms involved in neural plasticity — the ability of neurons to adapt during processes like learning or injury — and development of neurodegenerative disorders. He is the recipient of the Alzheimer's Association Zenith Award, the Metropolitan Life Foundation Medical Research Award, and the Santiago Grisolia Chair Prize.  He was as the founding Editor and Editor-in-Chief of NeuroMolecular Medicine and Ageing Research Reviews.

On June 3, 2019, an International Symposium, "Pathways Towards and Away from Brain Health," was held to honor him on his retirement from the NIH.

Selected publications

References

External links
Johns Hopkins profile of Mark Mattson

1957 births
American neuroscientists
Colorado State University alumni
Fasting researchers
Johns Hopkins University faculty
Living people
University of Iowa alumni